Joy Will Find a Way is the sixth full-length album by Canadian singer/songwriter Bruce Cockburn. The album was released in 1975 by True North Records and received a gold certification in Canada in 1985.

Reception

In a retrospective review, AllMusic critic Brett Hartenbach wrote, "Though it will appeal to the converted, Joy Will Find a Way, Bruce Cockburn's sixth album, won't do much to garner support outside of these circles. As always, Cockburn is never less than literate, and his guitar is consistently impressive throughout (check out the instrumental "Skylarking"), but there remains the tendency to become overwrought lyrically, as well as to get bogged down musically in the sort of folkish repetition that can be more tiresome than entrancing... Though he hadn't quite hit his stride at this point, this is the best of Bruce Cockburn's first half-dozen albums."

Track listing
All songs written by Bruce Cockburn except where noted.

"Hand-dancing" – 4:30
"January in the Halifax Airport Lounge" – 3:19
"Starwheel" (Bruce Cockburn, Kitty Cockburn) – 3:16
"Lament for the Last Days" - 5:24
"Joy Will Find a Way (A Song About Dying)"  – 3:50
"Burn" – 4:08
"Skylarking" – 3:20
"A Long-time-love Song" – 4:41
"A Life Story" – 6:16
"Arrows of Light" - 4:55

Album credits
Personnel
Bruce Cockburn – composer, vocals, guitar, dulcimer
Dennis Pendrith - bass
Terry Clarke - drums
Dido Morros - percussion
Pat Godfrey - keyboards
Eugene Martynec - guitar
Beverley Glenn Copeland - backing vocals
Linda Page Harpa - backing vocals
Malika Hollander - backing vocals
Zezi Taeb - backing vocals
Alexa De Wiel - backing vocals
Jeffrey Crelingston - backing vocals

Production
Mavel Mousette - translation
Eugene Martynec - producer
Blair Drawson - album cover paintings
Harry Savage - album photography
Bart Schoales - art direction
Bernie Finkelstein - direction

References

1975 albums
Bruce Cockburn albums
Albums produced by Gene Martynec
True North Records albums